"You've Seen the Butcher" is a song by the American alternative metal band Deftones. It was the fourth and final single released from their sixth studio album, Diamond Eyes (2010). The song memorably uses unusual time signatures.

To support funding for bassist Chi Cheng, the drumset and keyboard used in filming the music video were auctioned.

Music video
The music video for "You've Seen the Butcher" was directed by Jodeb Films. It shows the band playing in a worn-out library, which appears to be floating in the air, while library books rain down from the sky. Attractive young women form a crowd around the band as they play, getting more aggressive with the band and grabbing them. One even rips Chino Moreno's shirt. When the song reaches the bridge, blood starts pouring from the ceiling of the library, spraying both the band and the women. The end of the video depicts a bloody, drenched Deftones.

The video premiered via Myspace and MTV2 on October 28, 2010, and received airplay on MTV2's AMTV.

Track listing

Personnel
Deftones
 Chino Moreno - vocals
 Stephen Carpenter - guitars
 Abe Cunningham - drums
 Frank Delgado - keyboards, samples, turntables
 Sergio Vega - bass

Production
 Nick Raskulinecz - producer

Chart history

References

External links
 Deftones release video for “You’ve Seen The Butcher”
 DEFTONES: 'You've Seen The Butcher' Video Released
 Deftones: Post Still From “You’ve Seen The Butcher” Video Shoot

2010 singles
Deftones songs
2010 songs
Reprise Records singles
Songs written by Stephen Carpenter
Songs written by Abe Cunningham
Songs written by Chino Moreno
Songs written by Sergio Vega (bassist)
Songs written by Frank Delgado (American musician)
Song recordings produced by Nick Raskulinecz